Stryzhavka is an urban-type settlement in the Vinnytsya oblast in Ukraine, located in the historic region of Podolia. The population is

History
The town is founded in 1552. Until the Partitions of Poland it was part of the Bracław Voivodeship of the Lesser Poland Province of the Polish Crown. Polish nobleman Michał Grocholski founded a Classicist palace in Strzyżawka, destroyed in 1918.

Before the war, there was a significant Jewish population.

On January 10, 1942, 227 Jews from the village are murdered by an Einsatzgruppen. The next day, 12 Jews are also shot in a mass execution. A memorial is built on the site of the massacre.

In June 1942, the Werwolf (Wehrmacht HQ) is built with forced labor.

References

Urban-type settlements in Vinnytsia Raion
Vinnitsky Uyezd
Jewish Ukrainian history
Holocaust locations in Ukraine